"Fast as You" is a song written and recorded by American country music artist Dwight Yoakam.  It was released in October 1993 as the third single from his album This Time.  Like his previous two singles, this song topped out at #2 in the United States, while it peaked at #5 in Canada. This is his last American top 10 hit to date, while he'd have three more in Canada, including another number-one. This is also his second single to enter the Billboard Hot 100, peaking at #70 on that chart.

Country music duo Steel Magnolia recorded a live version of the song, which is included in their 2010 extended play, Steel Magnolia — EP. Trio Runaway June also recorded a cover of the song, which appears on their self-titled 2018 EP and their debut album Blue Roses.

Music video
The music video was directed by Dwight Yoakam and Carolyn Mayer. It features Yoakam singing the song at a concert.

Chart performance
"Fast as You" debuted at number 72 on the U.S. Billboard Hot Country Singles & Tracks for the week of July 3, 1993.

Year-end charts

References

1993 singles
1993 songs
Dwight Yoakam songs
Steel Magnolia songs
Runaway June songs
Songs written by Dwight Yoakam
Reprise Records singles
Song recordings produced by Pete Anderson